The Deerslayer is a 1957 American Western film in CinemaScope and Color by De Luxe, directed by Kurt Neumann and written by Carroll Young, Neumann and an uncredited Dalton Trumbo. The film stars Lex Barker, Rita Moreno, Forrest Tucker, Cathy O'Donnell, Jay C. Flippen and Carlos Rivas. It is based on the 1841 novel The Deerslayer by James Fenimore Cooper. The film was released on September 10, 1957 by 20th Century-Fox.

Plot
Frontiersman Deerslayer and his Mohican blood brother Chingachgook are attacked by a scout for a Huron war party. Dispatching the Huron, they hear war cries from the river and help white trader Harry March, who is being chased by the war party in canoes. Deerslayer and Chingachgook, cannot understand why the Hurons have gone on the warpath so far west of the white settlements. Harry tells them that he is making for a floating fort moored in the middle of Lake Otsego, on which old Tom Hutter and his two daughters, Judith and Hetty, live. Harry needs the help of Deerslayer and Chingachgook to deliver the girls to safety in Albany. When they arrive at the fort, Deerslayer and Chingachgook offer their help because a band of Hurons is coming down the river, but they are shunned by Tom, who knows why the Hurons are about to attack but is also trying to hide a sinister secret.

Cast 
Lex Barker as Deerslayer
Rita Moreno as Hetty Hutter 
Forrest Tucker as Harry March
Cathy O'Donnell as Judith Hutter
Jay C. Flippen as Old Tom Hutter
Carlos Rivas as Chingachgook
Joseph Vitale as Huron chief
John Halloran as Old Warrior

References

External links 
 

1957 films
20th Century Fox films
CinemaScope films
American Western (genre) films
1957 Western (genre) films
Films based on works by James Fenimore Cooper
Films directed by Kurt Neumann
Films set in the 1740s
American historical adventure films
1950s historical adventure films
Films scored by Paul Sawtell
1950s English-language films
1950s American films